Near Oceania is the part of Oceania settled 35,000 years ago, comprising Australia, New Guinea, and north-western Island Melanesia: the Bismarck Archipelago and the Solomon Islands.

Prehistory
The great nineteenth-century naturalist Alfred Russel Wallace explored Nusantara, drawing attention to fundamental biological differences between the Australia-New Guinea region and Southeast Asia. The boundary between the Asian and Australian faunal regions consists of a zone of smaller islands bearing the name of Wallacea, in honor of the co-discoverer of the theory of natural selection.

Wallace speculated that the key to understanding these differences would lie in "now-submerged lands, uniting islands to continents" (1895). We now know that at several intervals during the Pleistocene, the sea surface was 130 metres below the current sea level. At these times New Guinea, Tasmania, the Aru Islands, and some smaller islands were joined to the Australian mainland. Biogeographers call this enlarged Greater Australian continent Sahul (Ballard, 1993) or Meganesia. West of Wallacea, the vast Sunda Shelf was also exposed as dry land, greatly extending the Southeast Asian mainland to include the Greater Sunda Islands of Sundaland. However, the islands of Wallacea (primarily Sulawesi, Ambon, Ceram, Halmahera, and the Lesser Sunda Islands) always remained an island world, imposing a barrier to the dispersal of terrestrial vertebrates, including early hominids.

To the north and east of New Guinea, the islands of Near Oceania (the Bismarck Archipelago and the Solomons) were likewise never connected to Sahul by dry land, for deep-water trenches also separate these from the Australian continental shelf.

It seems that human colonization of this region was most likely effected during the interval between 60,000 and 40,000 years ago, although some researchers would push the possible dates earlier. But the key point is that even when the oceans were at their lowest levels, there were always significant open-water gaps between the islands of Wallacea, and therefore, the arrival of humans into Sahul, necessitated over-water transport.
This was also the case of the expansion of humans beyond New Guinea into the archipelagoes of Near Oceania. Herein lies one of the most exciting and intriguing aspects of Pacific prehistory: that we are likely dealing with the earliest purposive voyaging in human history.

The settlement of Manus — in the Admiralty Islands — may represent a real threshold in voyaging ability as it is the only island settled in the Pleistocene beyond the range of one-way intervisibilty. Voyaging to Manus involved a blind crossing of some 60-90 km in a 200-300 km voyage, when no land would have been visible whether coming from the north coast of Sahul or New Hanover at the northern end of New Ireland. These would have been tense hours or days on board that first voyage and the name of Pleistocene Columbus who led this crew will never been known. The target arcs for Manus are 15° from New Hanover, 17° from Mussau and 28° from New Guinea. (Matthew Spriggs, The Island Melanesians, Oxford: Blackwell, 1997)

History of the term
The terms Remote Oceania and Near Oceania were proposed by anthropologists Roger Green and Andrew Pawley in 1973. By their definition, Near Oceania consists of New Guinea, the Bismarck Archipelago and the Solomon Islands, with the exception of Santa Cruz Islands. They are designed to dispel the outdated categories of Melanesia, Micronesia, and Polynesia; Near Oceania cuts right across the old category of Melanesia, which has shown to be not a useful category in respect to the geography, culture, language and human history of the region. The old categories have been in use since they were proposed by French explorer Jules Dumont d'Urville in the mid-19th century. Though the push of some people in academia has been to replace the categories with Green's terms since the early 1990s, the old categories are still used in science, popular culture and general usage.

See also
 East Melanesian Islands
 Micronesian navigation
 Polynesian navigation
 Remote Oceania
 Remote Oceanic languages

References

Regions of Oceania
Geography of Melanesia